Association Chorrillos was a Peruvian football (soccer) club based in the city of Chorrillos, Lima, Peru.

History
The club was founded in the Chorrillos District, Lima.

The club was the 1951 Segunda División Peruana champion.

Association Chorrillos participated in the 1952 Peruvian Primera División.

Honours

National
Peruvian Segunda División: 1
Winners (1): 1951
Runner-up (2): 1950, 1961

Regional
Liga Regional de Lima y Callao:
Runner-up (1): 1945

See also
List of football clubs in Peru
Peruvian football league system

External links
 Peru 2nd Division Champions (Lima)
 Peruvian First Division 1952

Football clubs in Peru